Mauterndorf Airport is a private use airport located  east-southeast of Mauterndorf, Salzburg, Austria.

See also
List of airports in Austria

References

External links 
 Airport record for Mauterndorf Airport at Landings.com

Airports in Austria
Buildings and structures in Salzburg (state)
Transport in Salzburg (state)